Ian Mackay is the name of:

 Ian Mackay (field hockey) (born 1938), Olympic hockey player
 Ian Mackay (footballer) (born 1986), Spanish professional footballer 
 Ian Reay Mackay (born 1922), Australian immunologist
 Ian Mackay (rugby league) (born 1952), Australian rugby league player

See also
 Ian McKay (disambiguation)
 Iain Mackay (disambiguation)
 Ian MacKaye (born 1962), American singer, musician and producer